Imperial Forestry Institute may refer to: 

 Imperial Forestry Institute (UK), Oxford; incorporated into the Department of Plant Sciences, University of Oxford
 Imperial Forestry Institute (Japan), in the Faculty of Agriculture, Kyoto Imperial University, now Kyoto University
 Imperial Forestry Institute (Russia), Saint Petersburg, later the S. M. Kirov Forestry Academy; today the Saint Petersburg State Forest Technical University

It may also refer to: 

 Imperial Academy of Forestry (Austria), Mariabrunn; incorporated into the University of Natural Resources and Life Sciences, Vienna
 Imperial Forestry School (France), Nancy, France, also known as the French National School of Forestry (École nationale des eaux et forêts); today part of AgroParisTech
 Imperial Forestry School (India), Dehradun, India; incorporated into the Forest Research Institute, Dehradun
 Forestry Department, Imperial University of Peking; incorporated into the Beijing Forestry University, China

See also 
 List of historic schools of forestry